Molly Carlson (born September 22, 1998) is a Canadian high diver. She is a member of Canada's senior national high diving team and placed second at the 2022 Red Bull Cliff Diving World Series. Carlson uploads videos of herself diving on TikTok.

Early life and education 
Carlson was born in Fort Frances, Ontario. She grew up in Thunder Bay. She has a younger sister, Megan. Carlson did gymnastics as a small child and began diving in 2008 at age nine. She began training with the Thunder Bay Diving Club in 2008. During her final year of high school, Carlson relocated from Thunder Bay to Toronto to focus on diving and training to make the 2016 Olympic team.

She graduated from Florida State University in 2020 with a Bachelor of Arts in psychology. After graduation, Carlson relocated to Canada.

Carlson is currently enrolled in a Masters of Arts in counselling psychology at Yorkville University.

Career

Junior and university (2013–2020) 
At age 10, Carlson qualified for the 2009 Pan Am Junior Games. In standard competitive diving, competing on the springboard and platform, Carlson was a seven-time national junior champion and a two-time Junior Pan-American champion (2013 and 2015). Carlson competed at the Nanjing 2014 Youth Olympics in the three-meter competition. Carlson won gold at the 2013 and 2014 International Youth Diving Meets. In 2014 and 2016, she was a Junior World Championship Finalist. She tried to make Canada's 2016 Olympic diving team, but placed fifth.

From 2017 to 2020, Carlson competed for the Florida State Seminoles. She was an NCAA All-American in 2017, 2019, and 2020 and the ACC MVP/Diver of the Year in 2017, 2019, and 2020. In 2019, Carlson polled her Instagram followers to ask if she should compete in the Red Bull Cliff Diving World Series. They voted overwhelmingly yes.

High diving (2020-present) 

After graduation, Carlson transitioned to cliff diving. She began high diving after a series of wrist injuries made head-first entries difficult. Carlson competed in the 2021 Red Bull Cliff Diving World Series. She entered as a wild card for Canada. At her first cliff diving event in France, Carlson placed second. She finished third overall in the series.

In the 2022 Red Bull Cliff Diving World Series, Carlson won the Boston event. For her final dive, Carlson was awarded the season's first 10. At 23, she was the youngest person to win an event at a Red Bull Cliff Diving World Series. Her boyfriend, British diver Aidan Heslop, broke the record later that day, winning the men's event at age 20. Carlson also placed second at the Paris event and the event at Lake Uri in Sisikon, Switzerland. Carlson ultimately placed second overall in the series.

Carlson trains at the Olympic Pool in Montreal, the only training facility in the world with an indoor 20-metre platform. She is coached by Stéphane Lapointe. She won the 2022 AthletesCAN True Sport Award.

With over 3.5 million followers on TikTok, Carlson chronicles her diving career on social media. On social media, she has founded the #BraveGang, through which she shares her own mental health journey and struggles in addition to providing a community for others to discuss their mental health.

References 

1998 births
Florida State Seminoles women's divers
Sportspeople from Fort Frances
Female high divers
Canadian female divers
Living people
Divers at the 2014 Summer Youth Olympics
21st-century Canadian women